Habibur Rahman Mia is a Bangladesh Awami League politician and the former Member of Parliament of Patuakhali-5.

Career
Mia was elected to parliament from Patuakhali-5 as a Bangladesh Awami League candidate in 1973.

References

Awami League politicians
Living people
1st Jatiya Sangsad members
Year of birth missing (living people)